The N-57 (also called the OKB-16-57) was a 57 mm Soviet autocannon designed shortly after WWII by Alexander Nudelman, and tested on the prototype of the MiG-9 interceptor (known internally as the I-300) . Due to being a prototype weapon of the early Cold War, not much is known about the N-57 and there is a lot of conflicting data on this weapon.

References

57 mm artillery
Autocannons of the Soviet Union
Aircraft guns of the Soviet Union